The Datsun DC-3 was a lightweight automobile produced by Nissan and sold under the Datsun brand in 1952. 

The series was a predecessor to the Fairlady sports cars, and succeeded the pre-war Road Star. The side badges read "Datsun 20" (20 meaning 20PS). Leaf springs were used in the suspension, and a three-speed manual transmission was specified. Four people could ride in the DC-3. Only 50 DC-3s were ever built; of these, 30 were sold (the remaining cars were converted back into trucks). A variant of the DC-3 was the Datsun 5147 pickup.

References
 
 
 

DC-3
Cars introduced in 1952